West Buffalo Peak, elevation , is a summit in the Mosquito Range of central Colorado. The mountain is the highest peak of the Buffalo Peaks, slightly taller than East Buffalo Peak. It is located in the Buffalo Peaks Wilderness.

See also

Buffalo Peaks Wilderness
List of mountain peaks of North America
List of mountain peaks of the United States
List of mountain peaks of Colorado

References

Mountains of Colorado
Mountains of Park County, Colorado
Mountains of Chaffee County, Colorado
North American 4000 m summits